Stefan Ortega Moreno (born 6 November 1992) is a German professional footballer who plays as a goalkeeper for Premier League club Manchester City.

Personal life 
Stefan Ortega was born in Hofgeismar, Hesse. His father is Spanish whilst his mother is German.

Club career

Germany
Ortega began his career at the north Hessian club TSV Jahn Calden before transferring to KSV Baunatal, then to KSV Hessen Kassel. In 2007, he transferred to Arminia Bielefeld and became a part of their youth setup. In the 2010–11 Season he had six appearances for the B team competing in the Regionalliga West. One year later the first team called him, and he made his senior debut for Arminia on 1 October 2011 against 1. FC Heidenheim replacing the injured Patrick Platins. After a bad performance against rivals Preußen Münster, Ortega lost his place to the Platins, instead appearing primarily in the regional Westfalenpokal. Nevertheless, Ortega was part of the Arminia squad that achieved promotion to the 2. Bundesliga at the end of the 2012–13 season, subsequently agreeing to a two-year contract extension.

In June 2014 Ortega joined TSV 1860 Munich on a free transfer. He made his Münchner Lions debut in the 1st round of the 2014–15 DFB-Pokal, winning 2–1 over Holstein Kiel. After Gábor Király departed for Fulham F.C. in August 2014, Ortega established himself as first-choice goalkeeper.

1860 Munich were relegated at the end of the 2016–17 season; Ortega left the club, transferring back to Arminia on a three-year contract, succeeding the outgoing Wolfgang Hesl. In January 2020, Ortega extended his contract until June 2022 following transfer interest from Bundesliga club Bayer 04 Leverkusen. With Arminia Bielefeld, Ortega was promoted to the Bundesliga in 2020. At his first season in the Bundesliga, the club secured 15th-place finish and avoided relegation after a 2–0 win in the away match against VfB Stuttgart on the final matchday. The German football magazine "Kicker" rated Ortega as the second best goalkeeper in the league. Arminia Bielefeld were relegated from the Bundesliga the following season.

Manchester City
In July 2022, Ortega signed with Premier League champions Manchester City on a free transfer. Ortega started the season on the bench for City's 1–3 defeat to Liverpool in the FA Community Shield on 30 July.

He played his first match in a UEFA Champions League group stage match against Borussia Dortmund, which finished 0–0. He also played the next Champions League group stage match against Sevilla, which they won 3–1 and in the third round of the Carabao Cup against Chelsea, making crucial saves to result in a 2–0 win to City on 9th November at the Etihad Stadium.

International career
In fall 2010, Ortega was called up to the German U19 national team, but remained an unused substitute. On 21 May 2021, Stefan Ortega was nominated as a potential reserve for the Germany national team for UEFA Euro 2020. His call-up for the squad was contingent if Manuel Neuer, Bernd Leno or Kevin Trapp had to withdraw due to injury.

Career statistics

Club

References

External links

1992 births
Living people
People from Hofgeismar
Sportspeople from Kassel (region)
German people of Spanish descent
German footballers
Footballers from Hesse
Association football goalkeepers
Arminia Bielefeld players
TSV 1860 Munich players
Manchester City F.C. players
Bundesliga players
2. Bundesliga players
3. Liga players
German expatriate footballers
German expatriate sportspeople in England
Expatriate footballers in England